Trademark troll is a pejorative term for any entity that attempts to register a trademark without intending to use it and who then threatens to sue others who use that mark. As a traditional troll is said to collect a toll from those trying to cross a bridge, a trademark troll "magically appears when an unsuspecting producer adopts the same or similar mark and poses upon them two choices: pay to get a license to use my mark or litigate".

The existence of trademark trolls exemplifies a common misunderstanding about trademark rights: the mere registration of a mark does not give the trademark owner a monopoly over that mark but must be used in commerce. As a consequence, while Leo Stoller, who has been labelled a "prototypical trademark troll" by intellectual property attorney Anna B. Folgers, had brought 47 trademark infringement suits , no court had found any infringement and the Northern District of Illinois had enjoined him from filing new actions without the court's permission. In a similar manner, the business practices of Tim Langdell of Edge Games were referred to as trolling by the US District Court after it was found that there was no evidence of commercial use of the asserted marks but that there was instead evidence that Langdell had fraudulently obtained and/or maintained many of his registrations.

Another more targeted example in 2008 involved Never Give Up Limited claiming that they owned the brands of two fruit juice chains, Juiceling in Glasgow and Juiced Up in Edinburgh. According to undercover reporting by the BBC, Never Give Up's representative, John Blanchard, sought tens of thousands of pounds to sell the trademarks back.

A more successful example was in November 2007, when businessman Dave Behar and his internet content production company Positive Ions, Inc. sued Ion Media Networks, claiming that Positive Ions owned the trademark to the word "Ion" and that Ion Media was using the name "Ion" without permission. Positive Ions were awarded a $1.7 million settlement, however Ion Media continued using the "Ion" name for its channels. 

Another successful example was with PBS member station WNED's successful lawsuit against Reading Rainbow host LeVar Burton, demanding LeVar's RRKidz company handed over administrative access to other websites and social media accounts, and trying to stop Burton from using the Reading Rainbow catchphrase, "But you don't have to take my word for it," on his podcast. Ultimately, WNED announced a revamp of the show upon winning the lawsuit, which ended up in development hell.

See also
Copyright troll
Patent troll

References

Trademarks
Trademark law
Ethically disputed business practices
Pejorative terms
Criticism of intellectual property